Mnemata is a locality in Larnaca, Cyprus. An archaeological site named the Mnemata Site is located here. Over the site a supermarket now stands.

The area "had been used as a cemetery from the beginning of the Iron Age until the Roman times", and there were four cemeteries in its environs in 1989.

Archaeological excavation site
The site—at the western necropolis of the city-kingdom of Kition—"that became known as the Agios Georgios cemetery, occupies the entire flat surface of the eminence an elevated land area or a hill" at Mnemata.

Etymology
Mnemata means graves.

References

Geography of Cyprus